Born in the Echoes is the eighth studio album by English electronic music duo The Chemical Brothers, released on 17 July 2015 by Virgin EMI Records in the United Kingdom and Astralwerks in the United States. It was their first studio album since 2010's Further. The album debuted at number 1 on the UK Albums Chart, marking the duo's sixth chart topper and making them the dance act with the most number-one albums ever in the UK.

The fourth track on the album, "EML Ritual" featured on the O2 "Priority Tickets – Follow the Rabbit" television commercial released in February 2018.

Promotion and release 
The album's first single, "Sometimes I Feel So Deserted" with vocals by Daniel Pearce, was released on 21 April 2015. The second single, "Go", was released on 5 May. "Under Neon Lights" was released as the third single on 23 June 2015, and features St. Vincent, credited by her real name (Annie Clark) on vocals.

The album was released on 17 July 2015.

Critical reception 

The performance of "Go" in the charts propelled The Chemical Brothers back into the mainstream, with DJs such as Annie Mac including it on their playlists of the year. However, some critics believe it was "poppy", and not keeping to their roots. Despite this, the remainder of the album was well received, drawing particular attention to the 1990s sound of singles such as "I'll See You There" and "Taste of Honey".

Track listing 

"Sometimes I Feel So Deserted" contains an interpolation of "Brighter Days" (1997) by Big Moses featuring Kenny Bobien, with re-recorded vocals by Daniel Pearce.

Personnel
The Chemical Brothers
Tom Rowlands
Ed Simons

Guest musicians
Beck – vocals on "Wide Open"
Cate Le Bon – vocals on "Born in the Echoes"
Annie Clark – vocals on "Under Neon Lights"
Ali Love – vocals on "EML Ritual"
Q-Tip – vocals on "Go"
Mark Ralph – bass on "Go"
Mark Ryder – electronic drums, additional programming

Charts and certifications

Weekly charts

Year-end charts

Certifications

References

2015 albums
Astralwerks albums
The Chemical Brothers albums
Virgin EMI Records albums